Najafabad (also Romanized as Najafābād; also known as Būīdāsh,  Boidash, Boydash, Bū Bedasht, Būydāgh, and Būydasht) is a village in Anzal-e Shomali Rural District, Anzal District, Urmia County, West Azerbaijan Province, Iran. At the 2006 census, its population was 349, in 107 families.

References 

Populated places in Urmia County